European Portuguese, also known as Portuguese of Portugal (Portuguese: português de Portugal), Iberian Portuguese (Portuguese: português ibérico), and Peninsular Portuguese (Portuguese: português peninsular), refers to the dialects of the Portuguese language spoken in Portugal. The word "European" was chosen to avoid the clash of "Portuguese Portuguese" ("") as opposed to Brazilian Portuguese.

Portuguese is a pluricentric language; it is the same language with several interacting codified standard forms in many countries. Portuguese is a Latin-based language with Celtic, Germanic, Greek, and Arabic influence. It was spoken in the Iberian Peninsula before as Galician-Portuguese. With the formation of Portugal as a country in the 12th century, the language evolved into Portuguese. In the Spanish province of Galicia to the north of Portugal, the native language is Galician. Both Portuguese and Galician are very similar and natives can understand each other as they share the same recent common ancestor. Portuguese and Spanish are different languages, although they share 89% of their lexicon. European Portuguese is notable among Romance languages in that it is stress-timed, rather than syllable-timed; in this respect it differs even from Brazilian Portuguese.

Phonology

Vowel classification 
Portuguese uses vowel height to contrast stressed syllables with unstressed syllables; the vowels  tend to be raised to  when they are unstressed (see below for details). The dialects of Portugal are characterized by reducing vowels to a greater extent than others.

European Portuguese possesses quite a wide range of vowel allophones:
 All vowels are lowered and retracted before .
 All vowels are raised and advanced before alveolar, palato-alveolar and palatal consonants.

It means that in  'we speak' there is the expected prenasal -raising: , while in  'we spoke' there are phonologically two  in crasis: . Close-mid vowels and open-mid vowels ( and ) contrast only when they are stressed. In unstressed syllables, they occur in complementary distribution.

According to Mateus and d'Andrade (2000:19), in European Portuguese, the stressed  only occurs in the following three contexts:
 Before a palatal consonant (such as  )
 Before the palatal front glide (such as  )
 Before a nasal consonant (such as  )

In Greater Lisbon (according to NUTS III, which does not include Setúbal)  can be centralized  before palatal sounds; e.g.

European Portuguese "e caduc" 
European Portuguese possesses a near-close near-back unrounded vowel. There is no standard symbol in the International Phonetic Alphabet for this sound.

Traditionally, it is pronounced when "e" is unstressed; e.g.  ,  .
However, if "e" is initial, then it is pronounced ; e.g.  ,  .
When "e" is adjacent to another vowel, it becomes ; e.g.  .
However, notice that when the e caduc is preceded by a semi-vowel, it may become   ,  .
E.g.
 The Portuguese e caduc may be elided, becoming in some instances a syllabic consonant; e.g.

The Portuguese spoken in the Azores is mainly based on language of the settlers who arrived on the islands in the 15th century, coming from
various regions of Portugal, but in particular the Algarve, Alentejo,
Extremadura and Minho. This little multifaceted ethnic configuration does not
created favorable conditions for the emergence of greater dialectal variations
on the islands, although scholars identify in each of them their
own accent. The population of São Miguel is characteristic, for example,
the pronunciation of the vowel U as [y], similar to the French U. in our
research, we collected several cases, among which the pronunciations [io'gyʀti]
for “yoghurt", and [yry'by] for “urubu”. On account of its phonetic characteristics, the island of São Miguel is the one with the pronunciation
which is further away from the pronunciation of the other islands. 
Other relevant phonetic features found in the Azores show phenomena that also occur in many regions where Portuguese is spoken.
Some of these traits are practiced in Brazil, such as opening vowels
pretonic, the fluctuation between the velar and the alveolar R, the umlaut of the base vowel
of stressed diphthongs, the deletion of the final R of oxytone words

Geographic variation 

European Portuguese is divided into Northern and Southern varieties. The prestige norms are based on two varieties: that of Coimbra and that of Lisbon.

Phonetically, differences emerge within Continental Portuguese. Also, the original alveolar trill  remains common in many northern dialects (especially in rural areas), like Transmontano, Portuense, Minhoto, and much of Beirão. Another regionalism can be found in the south and the islands with the use of the gerund in the present progressive tense rather than the infinitive.

Portuguese is spoken by a significant minority in Andorra and Luxembourg. The Principality of Andorra has shown interest in membership in the Community of Portuguese Language Countries (CPLP). There are also immigrant communities in France and Germany.

Galician
The Galician language, spoken in the Autonomous Community of Galicia in Spain, is very closely related to Portuguese. There is, as yet, no consensus among writers and linguists on whether Galician and Portuguese are still the same language (in fact they were for many centuries, Galician-Portuguese having developed in the region of the former Roman province of Gallaecia, from the Vulgar Latin that had been introduced by Roman soldiers, colonists and magistrates during the time of the Roman Empire) or distinct yet closely related languages.

Galicia has expressed interest in joining the CPLP as an associate observer pending permission from the Spanish government.

Prominence
The Instituto Camões is a Portuguese international institution dedicated to the worldwide promotion of the Portuguese language, Portuguese culture, and international aid, on behalf of the Government of Portugal.
 
RTP is the Portuguese public television network and also serves as a vehicle for European-Portuguese-providing media content throughout the world. There is a branch of RTP Internacional named RTP África, which serves Lusophone Africa.

In estimating the size of the speech community for European Portuguese, one must take into account the consequences of the Portuguese diaspora: immigrant communities located throughout the world in the Americas, Australia, Europe and Africa.

See also
 Portuguese language
 Acordo Ortográfico da Língua Portuguesa de 1990
Macanese Portuguese
Indian Portuguese
Malaccan Creole Portuguese
Galician Portuguese
Cape Verdean Portuguese

References

Works cited

External links 
 Description of the pronunciation rules of European Portuguese 
 Description of the pronunciation rules of Brazilian Portuguese
 Tables with the pronunciation of each vowel and consonant letter in European Portuguese
 Article on variation in European Portuguese
 On gerund clauses of Portuguese dialects

Portuguese dialects
Stress-timed languages
Articles containing video clips